Lindow Man, also known as Lindow II and (in jest) as Pete Marsh, is the preserved bog body of a man discovered in a peat bog at Lindow Moss near Wilmslow in Cheshire, North West England. The remains were found on 1 August 1984 by commercial peat cutters. Lindow Man is not the only bog body to have been found in the moss; Lindow Woman was discovered the year before, and other body parts have also been recovered. The find was described as "one of the most significant archaeological discoveries of the 1980s" and caused a media sensation. It helped invigorate study of British bog bodies, which had previously been neglected.

Dating the body has proven problematic, but it is thought that he was deposited into Lindow Moss, face down, some time between 2 BC and 119 AD, in either the Iron Age or Romano-British period. At the time of death, Lindow Man was a healthy male in his mid-20s, and may have been of high social status as his body shows little evidence of having done heavy or rough physical labour during his lifetime. There has been debate over the reason for his death; his death was violent and perhaps ritualistic.

The recovered body has been preserved by freeze-drying and is on permanent display at the British Museum, although it occasionally travels to other venues such as the Manchester Museum.

Background

Lindow Moss

Lindow Moss is a peat bog in Lindow, an area of Wilmslow, Cheshire, which has been used as common land since the medieval period. It formed after the last ice age, one of many such peat bogs in north-east Cheshire and the Mersey basin that formed in hollows caused by melting ice. Investigations have not yet discovered settlement or agricultural activity around the edge of Lindow Moss that would have been contemporary with Lindow Man; however, analysis of pollen in the peat suggests there was some cultivation in the vicinity.

It is a dangerous place; an 18th-century writer recorded people drowning there. For centuries the peat from the bog was used as fuel, and it continued to be extracted until the 1980s, by which time the process had been mechanised. Lindow Moss is a lowland raised mire; this type of peat bog often produces the best preserved bog bodies, allowing more detailed analysis. Lowland raised mires occur mainly in northern England and extend south to the Midlands. Lindow Man is one of 27 bodies to be recovered from such areas.

Preservation of bog bodies
The preservation of bog bodies is dependent on a set of specific physical conditions, which can occur in peat bogs. A sphagnum moss bog must have a temperature lower than 4 °C at the time of deposition of the body. The subsequent average annual temperature must be lower than 10 °C. Moisture must be stable in the bog year-round: it cannot dry out.

Sphagnum moss affects the chemistry of nearby water, which becomes highly acidic (a pH of roughly 3.3 to 4.5) relative to a more ordinary environment. The concentration of dissolved minerals also tends to be low. Dying moss forms layers of sediment and releases sugars and humic acids which consume oxygen. Since the surface of the water is covered by living moss, water becomes anaerobic. As a result, human tissues buried in the bog tend to tan rather than decay.

Lindow Woman

On 13 May 1983, two peat workers at Lindow Moss, Andy Mould and Stephen Dooley, noticed an unusual object—about the size of a football—on the elevator taking peat to the shredding machine. They removed the object for closer inspection, joking that it was a dinosaur egg. Once the peat had been removed, their discovery turned out to be a decomposing, incomplete human head with one eye and some hair intact.

Forensics identified the skull as belonging to a European woman, probably aged 30–50. 
Police initially thought the skull was that of Malika Reyn-Bardt, who had disappeared in 1960 and was the subject of an ongoing investigation. While in prison on another charge, her husband, Peter Reyn-Bardt, had boasted that he had killed his wife and buried her in the back garden of their bungalow, which was on the edge of the area of mossland where peat was being dug. The garden had been examined but no body was found. When Reyn-Bardt was confronted with the discovery of the skull from Lindow Moss, he confessed to the murder of his wife.

The skull was later radiocarbon dated, revealing it to be nearly 2,000 years old. "Lindow Woman", as it became known, dated from around 210 AD. This emerged shortly before Reyn-Bardt went to trial, but he was convicted on the evidence of his confession.

Discovery

On 1 August 1984, Andy Mould, who had been involved in the discovery of Lindow Woman, took what he thought was a piece of wood off the elevator of the peat-shredding machine. He threw the object at Eddie Slack, his workmate. When it hit the ground, peat fell off the object and revealed it to be a human foot. The police were called and the foot was taken away for examination.

Rick Turner, the Cheshire County Archaeologist, was notified of the discovery and succeeded in finding the rest of the body, which later became known as Lindow Man. Some skin had been exposed and had started to decay, so to prevent further deterioration of the body, it was re-covered with peat. The complete excavation of the block containing the remains was performed on 6 August. Until it could be dated, it was moved to the Macclesfield District General Hospital for storage. As the body of Malika Reyn-Bardt had still not been found, it was initially thought possible the body might be hers, until it was determined to be male, and radiocarbon dated.

The owners of the land where Lindow Man was found donated the body to the British Museum, and on 21 August it was transported to London.
At the time, the body was dubbed "Pete Marsh" by Middlesex Hospital radiologists, a name subsequently adopted by local journalists, as was the similar "Pete Bogg".

The find was announced to the press during the second week of investigation. 
As the best preserved bog body found in Britain, its discovery caused a domestic media sensation and received global coverage. Sparking excitement in the country's archaeological community, who had long expected such a find, it was hailed as one of the most important archaeological discoveries of the 1980s. A Q.E.D. documentary about Lindow Man broadcast by the BBC in 1985 attracted 10 million viewers.

Lindow Man's official name is Lindow II, as there are other finds from the area: Lindow I (Lindow Woman) refers to a human skull, Lindow III to a "fragmented headless body", and Lindow IV to the upper thigh of an adult male, possibly that of Lindow Man. After the discovery of Lindow Man, there were no further archaeological excavations at Lindow Moss until 1987. A large piece of skin was found by workmen on the elevator on 6 February 1987. On this occasion, the police left the investigation to the archaeologists. Over 70 pieces were found, constituting Lindow III. Although the bone was not as well preserved as that of Lindow Man, the other tissues survived in better condition. The final discovery was that of Lindow IV on 14 June 1988. Nearly three months later, on 12 September, a right thigh was discovered in the peat on the bucket of a digger. The proximity of the discovery sites, coupled with the fact that the remains were shown to come from an adult male, means that Lindow IV is probably part of Lindow Man.

Remains and investigation

Lindow Man marked the first discovery in Britain of a well-preserved bog body; its condition was comparable to that of Grauballe Man and Tollund Man from Denmark. Before Lindow Man was found, it was estimated that 41 bog bodies had been found in England and Wales and 15 in Scotland. Encouraged by the discovery of Lindow Man, a gazetteer was compiled, which revealed a far higher number of bog bodies: over 85 in England and Wales and over 36 in Scotland. Prior to the discovery of the bodies in Lindow Moss, British bog bodies had been a relatively neglected subject compared to European examples. The interest caused by Lindow Man led to more in-depth research of accounts of discoveries in bogs since the 17th century; by 1995, the numbers had changed to 106 in England and Wales and 34 in Scotland. The remains covered a large time frame.

It was possible to ascertain that his age at death was around the mid-20s. The body retains a trimmed beard, moustache, and sideburns of brown hair, as well as healthy teeth with no visible cavities, and manicured fingernails, indicating he did little heavy or rough work. Apart from a fox-fur armband, Lindow Man was discovered completely naked. When he died, Lindow Man was suffering from slight osteoarthritis and an infestation of whipworm and maw worm. As a result of decalcification of the bones and pressure from the peat under which Lindow Man was buried, his skull was distorted. While some preserved human remains may contain DNA, peat bogs such as Lindow Moss are generally poor for such a purpose, and it is unlikely that DNA could be recovered from Lindow Man.

Lindow Man and Lindow III were found to have elevated levels of copper on their skin. The cause for this was uncertain as there could have been natural causes, although a study by Pyatt et al. proposed that the bodies may have been painted with a copper-based pigment. To test this, skin samples were taken from places likely to be painted and tested against samples from areas where painting was unlikely. It was found that the copper content of the skin of the torso was higher than the control areas, suggesting that the theory of Pyatt et al. may have been correct. However, the conclusion was ambiguous as the overall content was above that expected of a male, and variations across the body may have been due to environmental factors. Similarly, green deposits were found in the hair, originally thought to be a copper-based pigment used for decoration, but it was later found to be the result of a reaction between the keratin in the hair and the acid of the peat bog.

Dating Lindow Man is problematic as samples from the body and surrounding peat have produced dates spanning a 900-year period. Although the peat encasing Lindow Man has been radiocarbon dated to about 300 BC, Lindow Man himself has a different date. Early tests at different laboratories returned conflicting dates for the body; later tests suggested a date between 2 BC and 119 AD. There has been a tendency to ascribe the body to the Iron Age period rather than Roman due to the interpretation that Lindow Man's death may have been a ritual sacrifice or execution. Explanations for why the peat in which he was found is much older have been sought. Archaeologist P. C. Buckland suggests that as the stratigraphy of the peat appears undisturbed, Lindow Man may have been deposited into a pool that was already some 300 years old. Geographer K. E. Barber has argued against this hypothesis, saying that pools at Lindow Moss would have been too shallow, and suggests that the peat may have been peeled back to allow the burial and then replaced, leaving the stratigraphy apparently undisturbed.

Lindow Man's last meal was preserved in his stomach and intestines and was analysed in some detail. It was hoped that investigations into the contents of the stomach would shed light on the contemporary diet, as was the case with Grauballe Man and Tollund Man in the 1950s. The analysis of the contents of the digestive system of bog bodies had become one of the principal endeavours of investigating such remains. Analysis of the grains present revealed his diet to be mostly of cereals. He probably ate slightly charred bread, although the burning may have had ritual significance rather than being an accident. Some mistletoe pollen was also found in the stomach, indicating that Lindow Man died in March or April.

One of the conclusions of the study was that the people buried in Lindow Moss may have had a less varied diet than their European counterparts. According to Jody Joy, curator of the Iron Age collection at the British Museum, the importance of Lindow Man lies more in how he lived rather than how he died, as the circumstances surrounding his demise may never be fully established.

Cause of death

As the peat was cleaned off the body in the laboratory, it became clear that Lindow Man had suffered a violent death. The injuries included a V-shaped,  cut on top of his head; a possible laceration at the back of the head, ligature marks on the neck where a sinew cord was found, a possible wound on the right side of the neck, a possible stab wound in the upper right chest, a broken neck, and a fractured rib. Xeroradiography revealed that the blow on top of the head (causing the V-shaped cut) was caused by a relatively blunt object; it had fractured the skull and driven fragments into the brain. Swelling along the edges of the wound indicated that Lindow Man had lived after being struck. The blow, possibly from a small axe, would have caused unconsciousness, but the man could have survived for several hours afterwards. The ligature marks on the neck were caused by tightening the sinew cord found around his neck, possibly a garrotte or necklace.

It is not possible to confirm whether some injuries took place before or after death, due to the body's state of decay. This is the case for the wound in the upper right chest and the laceration on the back of the skull. The cut on the right of the neck may have been the result of the body becoming bloated, causing the skin to split; however, the straight edges to the wound suggest that it may have been caused by a sharp instrument, such as a knife. The ligature marks on the neck may have occurred after death. In some interpretations of Lindow Man's death, the sinew is a garrotte used to break the man's neck. However, Robert Connolly, a lecturer in physical anthropology, suggests that the sinew may have been ornamental and that ligature marks may have been caused by the body swelling when submerged. The rib fracture may also have occurred after death, perhaps during the discovery of the body, but is included in some narratives of the man's death. The broken neck would have proven the fatal injury, whether caused by the sinew cord tightening around the neck or by blows to the back of the head. After death, Lindow Man was deposited into Lindow Moss face down.

Hypothesis
Archaeologist Don Brothwell considers that many of the older bodies need re-examining with modern techniques, such as those used in the analysis of Lindow Man. The study of bog bodies, including these found in Lindow Moss, has contributed to a wider understanding of well-preserved human remains, helping to develop new methods in analysis and investigation. The use of sophisticated techniques, such as computer tomography (CT) scans, has marked the investigation of the Lindow bodies as particularly important. Such scans allow the reconstruction of the body and internal examination. Of the 27 bodies recovered from lowland raised mires in England and Wales, only those from Lindow Moss and the remains of Worsley Man have survived, together with a shoe from another body. The remains have a date range from the early 1st to the 4th centuries. Investigation into the other bodies relies on contemporary descriptions of the discovery.

The physical evidence allows a general reconstruction of how Lindow Man was killed, although some details are debated, but it does not explain why he was killed. In North West England, there is little evidence for religious or ritual activity in the Iron Age period. What evidence does survive is usually in the form of artefacts recovered from peat bogs. Late Iron Age burials in the region often took the form of a crouched inhumation, sometimes with personal ornaments. Although dated to the mid-1st century AD, the type of burial of Lindow Man was more common in the pre-historic period. In the latter half of the 20th century, scholars widely believed that bog bodies demonstrating injuries to the neck or head area were examples of ritual sacrifice. Bog bodies were associated with Germanic and Celtic cultures, specifically relating to head worship.

According to Brothwell, Lindow Man is one of the most complex examples of "overkill" in a bog body, and possibly has ritual meaning as it was "extravagant" for a straightforward murder. Archaeologists John Hodgson and Mark Brennand suggest that bog bodies may have been related to religious practice, although there is division in the academic community over this issue. In the case of Lindow Man, scholars debate whether the killing was murder or done as part of ritual. Anne Ross, an expert on Iron Age religion, proposed that the death was an example of human sacrifice and that the "triple death" (throat cut, strangled, and hit on the head) was an offering to several different gods. The wide date range for Lindow Man's death (2 BC to 119 AD) means he may have met his demise after the Romans conquered northern England in the 60s AD. As the Romans outlawed human sacrifice, such timing would open up other possibilities. This conclusion was emphasised by historian Ronald Hutton, who challenged the interpretation of sacrificial death. Connolly suggests that as Lindow Man was found naked, he could have been the victim of a violent robbery.

Joy said,
"The jury really is still out on these bodies, whether they were aristocrats, priests, criminals, outsiders, whether they went willingly to their deaths or whether they were executed – but Lindow was a very remote place in those days, an unlikely place for an ambush or a murder".

According to Anne Ross, a scholar of Celtic history and Don Robins, a chemist at the University of London, Lindow Man was likely a sacrifice victim of extraordinary importance. They identified his stomach contents as including the undigested remains of a partially burned barley griddle cake of a kind used by the ancient Celts to select victims for sacrifice. Such cakes were torn into fragments and placed in a sack, after which all candidates for sacrifice would withdraw a piece, with the one withdrawing the burnt piece being the one who would be sacrificed. They argued that Lindow Man was likely a high-ranking Druid who was sacrificed in a last-ditch effort to call upon the aid of three Celtic gods to stop a Roman offensive against the Celts in AD 60.

Conservation
 Environment and situation are the crucial factors that determine how corpses decay. For instance, corpses will decay differently depending on the weather, the way they are buried, and the medium in which they are buried. Peat slows the decay of corpses. It was feared that, once Lindow Man was removed from that environment, which had preserved the body for nearly 2,000 years, the remains would rapidly start to deteriorate, so steps were taken to ensure preservation. After rejecting methods that had been used to maintain the integrity of other bog bodies, such as the "pit-tanning" used on Grauballe Man, which took a year and a half, scientists settled on freeze-drying. In preparation, the body was covered in a solution of 15% polyethylene glycol 400 and 85% water to prevent its becoming distorted. The body was then frozen solid and the ice vaporised to ensure Lindow Man did not shrink.

Lindow Man is held in the British Museum. Before the remains were transferred there, people from North West England launched an unsuccessful campaign to keep the body in Manchester. The 2008–09 Manchester display, titled Lindow Man: A Bog Body Mystery Exhibition at the Manchester Museum, won the category "Best Archaeological Innovation" in the 2010 British Archaeological Awards, run by the Council for British Archaeology.

Critics have complained that, by museum display of the remains, the body of Lindow Man has been objectified rather than treated with the respect due the dead. This is part of a wider discussion about the scientific treatment of human remains and museum researchers and archaeologists using them as information sources.

Cultural references
British archaeologist and anthropologist Don Brothwell’s The Bog Man and the Archaeology of People provides an account of the modern scientific techniques employed to conserve and analyse Lindow Man.  Celtic history, language and lore scholar Anne Ross and archaeological chemist Don Robins's The Life and Death of a Druid Prince provides an account of the circumstances surrounding Lindow Man's life and death, in part hypothesising that he had lived as a highborn, perhaps even as a druid who was sacrificed to the gods at the time of the Menai Massacre and Boudica’s rebellion.

See also

 Haraldskær Woman
 List of bog bodies
 Ötzi

References

Notes

Footnotes

Bibliography

External links

1984 archaeological discoveries
1st-century deaths
Archaeological sites in Cheshire
Bog bodies
Deaths by strangulation
History of Cheshire
Iron Age Britain
Prehistoric burials in England
Romano-British objects in the British Museum
Year of birth unknown